Scott Michael Bennett (July 16, 1977 – December 9, 2022) was an American attorney, politician and Democratic member of the Illinois Senate representing the 52nd district from 2015 to 2022.

Early life
Bennett was born in Gibson City, Illinois, and moved to Champaign to attend law school. He was married with two children. Bennett worked as a prosecutor with the Office of the Champaign County State's Attorney.

Illinois Senate
Bennett was appointed to fill the vacancy left by Mike Frerichs, who resigned from representing the 52nd legislative district after he was elected Treasurer of Illinois in the 2014 general election. The 52nd district, located in Central Illinois, includes the towns of Champaign, Danville, Georgetown, Gifford, Rantoul, Thomasboro, and Urbana. His uncle Thomas M. Bennett also served in the Illinois General Assembly. Stacy Bennett succeeded Scott Bennett for the remainder of the 102nd General Assembly. On January 7, 2023, Paul Faraci, the Champaign Township Assessor, was appointed to fill the vacancy in the 103rd General Assembly created by Bennett's death.

Committee assignments
During the 102nd General Assembly, Senator Bennett was a member of the following Illinois Senate committees:

 Agriculture Committee (SAGR)
 (Chairman of) Appropriations - Higher Education Committee (SAPP-SAHE)
 Executive Appointments Committee (SEXA)
 (Chairman of) Higher Education Committee (SCHE)
 Judiciary Committee (SJUD)
 Judiciary - Business Entities Committee (SJUD-SJBE)
 (Chairman of) Judiciary - Privacy Committee (SJUD-SJPR)
 Labor Committee (SLAB)
 Redistricting Committee (SRED)
 (Chairman of) Redistricting - East Central & Southeast Illinois Committee (SRED-SRSE)
 Redistricting - Southern Illinois Committee (SRED-SRSI)
 Redistricting - West Central Illinois Committee (SRED-SRWC)
 State Government Committee (SGOA)
 (Chairman of) Unemployment Insurance (SLAB-SLUI)

Death
Bennett died from complications of a brain tumor in Urbana, Illinois, on December 9, 2022, at the age of 45.

References

External links
Senator Scott Bennett (D) 52nd District at the 98th Illinois General Assembly
By session: 98th

1977 births
2022 deaths
Deaths from brain cancer in the United States 
Neurological disease deaths in Illinois
Deaths from cancer in Illinois
Democratic Party Illinois state senators
Illinois lawyers
People from Champaign, Illinois
Illinois State University alumni
University of Illinois College of Law alumni
21st-century American politicians
People from Gibson City, Illinois
Bennett family of Illinois